Swainsonia fusca, common name : the dusky mitre,  is a species of sea snail, a marine gastropod mollusk in the family Mitridae, the miters or miter snails.

Description
The shell is nearly spindle-shaped, entirely brown and marked by bands of punctured dots. Size varies between 14 mm and 30 mm.

Distribution
This species is distributed in the Red Sea, in the Indian Ocean off Mozambique,  Mauritius and the Mascarene Basin and in the Atlantic Ocean along Angola.

References

 Michel, C. (1988). Marine molluscs of Mauritius. Editions de l'Ocean Indien. Stanley, Rose Hill. Mauritius
 Drivas, J. & M. Jay (1988). Coquillages de La Réunion et de l'île Maurice
 Cernohorsky W. O. (1991). The Mitridae of the world (Part 2). Monographs of Marine Mollusca 4. page(s): 131
 Gofas, S.; Afonso, J.P.; Brandào, M. (Ed.). (S.a.). Conchas e Moluscos de Angola = Coquillages et Mollusques d'Angola. [Shells and molluscs of Angola]. Universidade Agostinho / Elf Aquitaine Angola: Angola. 140 pp
 Poppe G.T. & Tagaro S.P. (2011). Addenda. pp. 545–649, in: G.T. Poppe (ed.), Philippine marine mollusks, volume 4. Hackenheim: ConchBooks.

External links
 

Mitridae
Gastropods described in 1824